William Howard Allen (July 8, 1790 – November 9, 1822) was a United States naval officer. He was born in Hudson, New York in 1790 to Howard Allen and Lydia Hussey. His sister was Harriet Allen, wife of New York lawyer and U.S. attorney general Benjamin Franklin Butler.

Allen attended school at the Hudson Academy for Boys, was appointed midshipman in 1808, and became a Second Lieutenant in 1811. During the War of 1812, he served aboard  and was captured by the British on August 14, 1813, during a battle with a British sloop-of-war, where he sustained a leg injury that required amputation. Allen was interned for eighteen months in Ashburton, England.

Allen later commanded the Alligator, which was sent to the West Indies to fight pirates as part of the West Indies Squadron. He was killed in action on November 9, 1822, during a battle with pirates and was buried in Matanzas, Cuba. In 1827, Allen's remains were moved for reburial in Hudson, New York, where a monument was erected in his memory.

References

United States Navy officers
1790 births
1822 deaths
People from Hudson, New York
Place of death missing
American military personnel killed in action